The 2014 Aaha! Rara Gold Cup is the 12th edition of the Aaha Gold Cup held in Pokhara and organised by Sahara Club. 12 teams participated in the tournament. The defending champions Three Star Club have chosen not to compete. All matches were held at the Pokhara Rangasala. Due to a sponsorship deal with Him-Shree Foods (a Pokhara-based food company), the tournament is officially known as the 12th Aaha! Rara Gold Cup 2014. Which is named after its flagship product, "RARA" instant noodles.

Sponsorship
Main sponsors of the tournament, Him Shree Foods Pvt Ltd provided 900,000 NPR to the organisers as the title sponsors.

Participating teams
  1st RGR XI, Brunei
  APF Club
  Dharan F.C.
  Jawalakhel Youth Club
  Machhindra Football Club
  Manang Marshyangdi Club
  Nepal Army Club
  Nepal Police Club
  Nepal U-16
  Sahara Club (Pokhara) (Hosts)
  Sankata Club
  Saraswoti Youth Club

1st round

Knockout stage

Matches

Quarter-finals

Semi-finals

Final

Prize money

References

Aaha! Gold Cup
Aaha